Francesco Gaetano or Francesco Caetani (died 1670) was a Roman Catholic prelate who served as Titular Archbishop of Rhodus (1652–1670) and Apostolic Nuncio to Spain (1652–1654).

Biography
On 12 August 1652, Francesco Gaetano was appointed during the papacy of Pope Innocent X as Titular Archbishop of Rhodus.
On 1 September 1652, he was consecrated bishop by Fabio Chigi, Cardinal-Priest of Santa Maria del Popolo, with Ranuccio Scotti Douglas, Bishop Emeritus of Borgo San Donnino, and Carlo Carafa della Spina, Bishop of Aversa, serving as co-consecrators. 
On 28 November 1652, he was appointed during the papacy of Pope Innocent X as Apostolic Nuncio to Spain until his resignation in December 1654.
He served as Titular Archbishop of Rhodus until his death on 17 March 1670.

While bishop, he was the principal co-consecrator of Giovanni Battista del Tinto, Archbishop of Trani (1666).

References

External links and additional sources
 (for Chronology of Bishops) 
 (for Chronology of Bishops) 
 
 

17th-century Roman Catholic titular bishops
Bishops appointed by Pope Innocent X
1670 deaths